Aisha Naeem is Pakistani politician hailing from Swabi District, belong to Pakistan Tehreek-e-Insaf. She served as a Parliamentary Secretary in Public Health Engineering department and member of the 10th Provincial Assembly of Khyber Pakhtunkhwa.

She has received matriculation level education.

She was re-elected to the Provincial Assembly of Khyber Pakhtunkhwa as a candidate of PTI on a reserved seat for women in 2018 Pakistani general election.

References

Living people
People from Swabi District
Pakistan Tehreek-e-Insaf MPAs (Khyber Pakhtunkhwa)
Khyber Pakhtunkhwa MPAs 2013–2018
Women members of the Provincial Assembly of Khyber Pakhtunkhwa
Year of birth missing (living people)
21st-century Pakistani women politicians